Mary Eileen Halford,  (nee Whitmarsh; 14 December 1915 — 1 November 2009) was a British tennis player and coach. In the 1940s she married Peter Halford, who played for the Great Britain national field hockey team.

Born in Dulwich, Halford made her Wimbledon debut at age 17 in 1933 and was the youngest competitor in the women's event that year. She made the singles fourth round at Wimbledon on four occasions and was a mixed doubles semi-finalist in 1936 with Frank Wilde. In 1946 she played Wightman Cup tennis for Great Britain.

Halford became non-playing captain of the Wightman Cup team in 1954. Her final year as captain in 1958 saw Great Britain win the tournament for the first time in 28-years, after which she announced her retirement. She was honoured with an OBE in the 1959 New Year Honours list for services to tennis.

References

1915 births
2009 deaths
British female tennis players
English female tennis players
British tennis coaches
Officers of the Order of the British Empire
Tennis people from Surrey
People from Dulwich